"Smoke and Fire" is a song recorded by American singer Sabrina Carpenter, released by Hollywood Records on February 19, 2016. Originally intended to be the lead single from her second studio album, Evolution, the song was dropped from the track listing; Carpenter later said that this is because the "evolution" came after this song. Later, "On Purpose" replaced it as the lead single. The song was produced by Ido Zmishlany and written by Carpenter and Zmishlany. It is a synth-pop song with influences of pop and lyrically it is a break-up song which expresses the feelings experienced after a relationship has ended. The song received generally positive reviews from critics. The song sold 6,012 digital copies in its first week.

Background and recording
Carpenter stated she wrote the song in 2015 and it was the first story she had been waiting to tell on her then-upcoming album which had no name at the time.  Carpenter stated she was still experimenting with new sounds of music and was writing a lot more. She said she had learned to use the internet more, for example she used Rhyme Zone to write "Smoke and Fire" along with other songs on her second album.

When asked what influenced her to write "Smoke and Fire," Carpenter said that she thought it was just "natural maturity" and that the style of music on her previous album, Eyes Wide Open, gave her the ability to be more free with what she eventually would fall into for future albums because she believed music was all about evolving, changing, growing up, and trying different things. She doesn't see "Smoke and Fire" as an extremely personal song, but rather that she hopes it will uplift anyone who listens to it. She felt as though she took the inspiration from a subject that was not good and turned it into something that was. She says she chose this as the expected first single because she felt that it was a great transition and development from Eyes Wide Open. Carpenter helped choose the sound for the song and co-wrote it with Ido Zmishlany. She states that there are many elements in "Smoke and Fire" that set the sound and tone for the rest of the then-upcoming album.

While fans had high hopes for "Smoke and Fire" to be on Carpenter's upcoming album, Carpenter released "On Purpose" in late July, which was revealed to be the lead single for her second album. In September, she announced the album's name, Evolution, as well as its track list and album cover. Fans noticed that "Smoke and Fire" was not a part of the track list, and Carpenter later confirmed on Twitter to one fan (who asked why "Smoke and Fire" was not on the album) that the "evolution" came after "Smoke and Fire".

In addition to producing "Smoke and Fire", Ido Zmishlany engineered the track. Serban Ghenea mixed the track and Chris Gehringer did the audio mastering at Sterling Sound in New York.

Composition
"Smoke and Fire" is a three minutes and forty-five seconds pop song with synthpop influences. According to the sheet music published at Musicnotes.com. The song is composed in the time signature of common time with a moderate rate of 84-88 beats per minute. It is written in the key of B minor and Carpenter's vocal range spans from the low F#3 to B4, thus making Carpenter's range almost one octave. Lyrically, "Smoke and Fire"  is a break-up song which expresses the feelings experienced after a relationship has ended.

Music video
The music video was released on March 11, 2016, on Vevo and YouTube. According to Carpenter, the video "show[s] flashback memories of an innocent love story in the midst of post breakup beauty and heartbreak." In one of the video's flashbacks, Carpenter's boyfriend visits her during a dance class. He tries to get her to come along with him, but she ignores him and continues dancing. Later, they leave the dance class together. As they walk down the street, Carpenter's boyfriend gives her a necklace. Throughout the video, Carpenter fiddles with the necklace. The video ends with her throwing the necklace in the trash.

Live performances
Carpenter made her daytime television debut on March 17, 2016 performing "Smoke and Fire" on Live with Kelly and Ryan. The song was performed on Disney Channel 2016 Radio Disney Music Awards and on Musikfest 2016. Carpenter performed the song on the Honda Stage at the iHeartRadio Theater LA along with some covers and songs from her first and second album. The song was part of her debut headline tour, being the first song to be performed. The song was included on The De-Tour being the second song to be performed.

Credits and personnel 
Recording and management
 Mastered at Sterling Sound 
 Seven Summits Music (BMI) obo Itself and Pink Mic Music (BMI), Songs of Universal, Inc/Music of Liberal Arts Publishing/Zmishlany Music (BMI)

Personnel

 Sabrina Carpenter – vocals, songwriting
 Ido Zmishlany – songwriting, production, engineering
 Serban Ghenea – mixing
 Chris Gehringer – mastering

Credits adapted from Tidal notes.

Release history

References

2016 singles
Sabrina Carpenter songs
2016 songs
Songs written by Ido Zmishlany
Hollywood Records singles
Songs written by Sabrina Carpenter